Iribarren may refer to:
 Iribarren (surname), a Basque surname
 Iribarren Municipality, in the Venezuelan state of Lara 
 Iribarren number, used in fluid dynamics to describe types of breaking waves and their effects on beaches and coastal structures